The  is a botanical garden specializing in Arecaceae. It is located at Nakagawara 928, Masaki, Iyo-gun, Ehime Prefecture 791-3192, Shikoku, Japan, and open seven days a week with free admission. The garden was established circa 1935, and now contains over 70 species of Palmae on 1.5 hectares.

References 
 BGCI entry
 Plaza.rakuten.co.jp/murasann/ Information (Japanese)

Botanical gardens in Japan
Gardens in Ehime Prefecture
Masaki, Ehime